Temara is a coastal town in Morocco.
It is located in the region of Rabat-Salé-Kénitra, directly south of Rabat on the Atlantic coast, in the suburban area of the capital. The city has 313,510 inhabitants as of 2014 and is the capital of Skhirate-Témara Prefecture. It is twinned with Saint Germain en Laye, France. The city has beaches and a small pleasure port.

History 
Temara was founded in the twelfth century (1130–1163) by Sultan Othman El Arfaoui, who built a mosque there and named it Al Maha. Five centuries later, Mulai Ismail built the current wall and made from Temara a ribat (casern) around Said mosque. Later, Mulay Abd ar-Rahman (1822–1859) and Mulay Abdul Aziz (1894–1908), completed (Kasbah of the Udayas) as religious and military camps.

Climate
Temara has a hot-summer Mediterranean climate (Köppen climate classification Csa). In winter there is more rainfall than in summer. About  of precipitation falls annually.

Economy 
Temara is close to Morocco's two main cities, Rabat, the capital, and economic center Casablanca.

Two main zones share the essence of the industrial units in the city of Temara. The first is in the direction of Casablanca, and, with a total area of 120 hectares, extensible to 300 Ha work 55 industrial units in this zone, contains the more clean industry sectors (textiles, packaging, printing, food). The second industrial zone is at the other end of town, in the direction of Rabat. It is the industrial zone Attasnia, which, with a total of 20 hectares, contains 23 industrial units (such as textiles, electronics, chemicals).

People 
The population was at first constituted by Zaer tribes and different tribes of Oudayas (Military groups from different regions of Morocco were established by the Sultan, as exchange of their Military service to the Sultan they had the right to cultivate the land). Now the population was diversified by all ethnicities in Morocco: Arabs and various Amazigh groups (Riffians, Chleuhs and Hassanis).

Notable people 
Mourad Hdiouad - Moroccan football manager

See also 
 Rabat Zoo

References

External links 
  Temara City

Populated places in Rabat-Salé-Kénitra
Skhirate-Témara Prefecture
Municipalities of Morocco
Prefecturial capitals in Morocco